The 2016 Skyrunning World Championships was the 3rd edition of the global skyrunning competition, Skyrunning World Championships, organised by the International Skyrunning Federation and was held in Spain (Lleida, Vall de Boí) from 22 to 23 July 2016.

Results

Ultra SkyMarathon (105 km)

Men

Women

SkyMarathon (42 km)

Men

Women

Vertical Kilometer

Men

Women

References

External links
 International Skyrunning Federation official web site

Skyrunning World Championships